SpellForce 2: Shadow Wars is a 2006 real-time strategy and role-playing video game, developed by Phenomic and published by JoWooD Productions. The second instalment in the SpellForce series, the game takes place several years after the events of 2003's SpellForce: The Order of Dawn. In Spellforce 2, players take on the role of a Rune Warrior, who is tasked with restoring peace and order to the land of Eo. The game features a single-player campaign with an expansive storyline, as well as multiplayer modes that allow players to battle against each other online.

Spellforce 2 combines elements of real-time strategy games with role-playing games. Players build and manage their own base, gather resources, and train units to fight against enemy forces. In addition, players can create their own hero character, who can level up and acquire new abilities over the course of the game.

Spellforce 2 also features a unique blend of fantasy and science fiction elements, with magic and technology existing side by side in the game's world. The game's graphics and sound design were well-received at the time of its release, and it has since gained a cult following among fans of the series. 

Players assume the role of an immortal warrior who seeks aid to protect his homeland from invaders, only to be drawn on a quest to defeat a powerful alchemist responsible for creating the immortality of the warrior and his people. The game combines elements of role-playing such as taking on quests, equipping characters and improving them when levelling up, alongside real-time strategy elements focused on gathering resources to construct bases and units.

The game's campaign can be played by a single player, or up to three players either online or via a local area network. Additionally, the game includes skirmish features, allowing players to fight battles against the AI or other players outside of the campaign, using any of the game's playable factions. Shadow Wars received positive reviews by critics, who praised it for improving on many areas that the first game had been lacking in. The game received three expansions following its release: SpellForce 2: Dragon Storm in 2007; SpellForce 2: Faith in Destiny in 2012; and SpellForce 2: Demons of the Past in 2014. A remastered version of the game complete with its first expansion, featuring an updated engine and widescreen support, was later released in April 2017, and a sequel, SpellForce 3, was released later that year on 7 December.

Gameplay 
SpellForce 2: Shadow Wars is both a real-time strategy and role-playing video game played from the third-person perspective. In the game, players take on the role of a character that they create (an avatar) who explore a variety of maps, conducting quests and killing monsters, and earning experience to level up, improve skills, and unlock the ability to wield new equipment. Alongside their character, players also control additional NPCs to help with exploration and combat, as well as armies of military units - done through gathering resources, building structures, and then recruiting units that are unlocked as a result - to help with large-scale battles.

As with traditional role-playing games, player-created characters can be defined by what skills players choose for them, which in turn impact what combat abilities and equipment they can wield in battle alongside their level. In Shadow Wars, skills are divided between two categories of skill trees: Melee, which is focused on heavy armour, ranged and close-combat weapons, and melee abilities; and Magic, which is focused on robes, staff and staves, and various types of magic spells. When the player's character levels up, they earn a skill point, which can be allocated to a skill, with new levels in a skill only possible when players allocate points within the skill tree  for example, unlocking the highest rank of an armour skill, requires spending a number of points not only in that skill, but other skills in the skill tree that are available for acquiring. Alongside their avatar, players are also joined by two types of NPCs, both of whom earn levels but are placed a few behind the player's avatar: up to five Heroes, whose equipment can be defined by the player, alongside whether skills are automatically or manually assigned; and up to two Companions, who join temporarily, but cannot have their equipment or skills chosen by the player. The game features a level cap of 30, with avatars and companions capped at 24. If during the course of the game the avatar, heroes or companion die, they can be revived by the others as long as they are alive, with the avatar able to summon the others to their location if required.

The game's real-time strategy elements occur when the player must use armies to accomplish objectives. In Shadow Wars, the player can control armies belonging to one of three different factions: The Realm, consisting of human, elves and dwarves; The Clans, consisting of orcs, trolls and barbarians; and The Pact, consisting of dark elves, gargoyles and shadows. Alongside these, players may also encounter armies of undead and demons during the main campaign. Each faction has their style of structures and units, which are created from gathering resources: Stone, needed to build structures and upgrade certain buildings; Silver, needed to recruit military units; and Lenya, which is needed mainly to recruit advanced units. Recruiting armies not only requires building production structures, but also deploying special structures and making upgrades to the faction's headquarter, both of which defines how many military slots they have for controlling units - with more advanced units accompanying two or three slots each. Workers may be recruited to gather resources, build structures and repair buildings, though the player is limited in how many they may recruit, with the cost of recruiting more increasing at certain thresholds.

In the game's Campaign mode, players traverse between various maps by completing Main Story quests, granting them access to other regions of the map and to portals that link between the maps; Side Quests also can be accomplished, providing mainly experience and other rewards for use in the game. In addition, players may also make use of Journey Stones - fast travel points which, when discovered and activated, allow the player to fast travel around the map or move to another in a different map. Outside of Campaign mode, players may also engage in three other game modes: Skirmish, which focuses on real-time strategy gameplay; Freeplay, which works similar to Campaign, but without an overarching plot; and Multiplayer, in which players can compete or work co-operatively with each other.

Plot

Setting 
SpellForce 2: Shadow Wars takes place on the high-fantasy world of Eo, inhabited by several races including humans, elves, dwarves and orcs. Eo was created by the binding of elementals by the god Aonir, and originally consisted of several continents, islands and oceans. However, decades ago, a powerful ritual known as the Convocation was invoked, creating a cataclysmic event that freed and the elementals, allowing them to shatter the world into a series of islands, held together by obelisks that channelled Aonir's power while being isolated from each other by an elemental sea that prevents travel by ship, leaving the remaining inhabitants to use a portal network devised by the mage Rohen Tahir.

The single-player campaign takes place amongst a group of these islands that formed the southern half of the continent of Fiara, and is inhabited by three powerful factions: the Realm - consisting of humans, dwarves and elves; the Clans - consisting of orcs, trolls and barbarians; and the Pact, consisting of dark elves, gargoyles, and shadows. The story itself takes place several years after the events of SpellForce: The Order of Dawn, and focuses on the plight of the Soulcarrier - a member of the immortal people known as the Shaikan, who were created by the power-hungry alchemist Malacay through the blood of the dragon Ur, granting them immortality and the power to resurrect others into their group with their own blood, but at the risk of falling under Malacay's power whenever he desires it.

Synopsis 
A civil war within the Pact comes to its conclusion when the dark elf sorcerer Sorvina kills the greatest warrior of the dark elves with an army of shadows. Nightsong, the warrior's daughter, flees her homeland in order to bring warning to the Realm of the approaching army, but is caught out by advance guards of dark elves while on the island of Iron Fields. While returning from a visit to a shrine, the Soulcarrier and their friends - members of the Shaikah that reside on the island - comes across her body after she dies in battle, and resurrect her with their blood in order. Made into a Shaikah herself, Nightsong warns the group of the impending danger, leading them to make a break for the Shaikan's fortress on the island, and to the great dragon Ur. Listening to her story, Ur advises the Soulcarrier to go with her to the Realm's capital on the island of Sevenskeep. Moments after they leave, Sorvina arrives with her army, and sets to work taking control of Iron Fields.

Upon arriving in Sevenskeep, the Soulcarrier finds its ruler unwilling to believe the danger, instead granting them a fiefdom for assisting the Realm with other problems. However, they soon change their mind when the Soulcarrier helps the dwarves and elves with their own problems in exchange for their assistance, and deal with a magician working for Sorvina that had inflicted Sevenskeep with a plague. With the Realm's aid, the Soulcarrier finds they must return home via a portal found within a massive fortress belonging to the Clan. During its siege, they witness the Pact kill Kor, an orc chieftain from the Clans who resented working with the shadows, leading the Soulcarrier to resurrect them for information before allowing them to return home. Eventually, the Realm arrive in Iron Fields and proceed to help in the fight against the Pact's army, but arrive too late to save the Shaikan from being killed by one of Sorvina's beasts, with Ur having been captured by the Pact.

Angered at what occurred in their absence, the Soulcarrier vows revenge on the Pact. However, when the Realm refuses to join them on their quest, they find themselves possessed by a second voice, which insults their allies and ends their alliance with them. When Nightsong questions what happened, the Soulcarrier reveals that they must have been chosen for possession by the spirit of the alchemist Malacay - a recurring curse amongst the Shaikan he created. Seeking new allies for their quest, the Soulcarrier ventures to the lands of the Clans, and enlists Kor's assistance in securing helping from his people.

Release

The Russian and European versions of SpellForce 2 are protected by StarForce copy protection system. The NA version is protected by TAGES.

While the game originally featured a central online matchmaking service, this service shut down in 2009.  Originally, the developers announced that a new contract for resuming matchmaking would take effect around July 2009.  However, as of February 2010, the online matchmaking is still unavailable. Multiplayer is still possible via LAN or by using a service such as Hamachi.

The game was re-released in 2008 on GamersGate and Steam, and in 2011 on GOG.com. In April 2017 Spellforce 2: Shadow Wars and SpellForce 2: Dragon Storm were released with an updated engine and widescreen support as Spellforce 2: Anniversary Edition. In October 2007, SpellForce Universe Edition was released which contained all previous SpellForce games and expansion packs.

Reception 

SpellForce 2: Shadow Wars was well received by both critics and players. According to the Metacritic website, it obtained a score of 80/100 from critics, as of August 24, 2014.

Many of the criticisms of the original SpellForce (e.g. poor integration of role-playing game and real time strategy aspects, a confusing interface, and an overly cumbersome real time strategy system) were improved upon in this sequel. While many reviewers indicate that SpellForce 2: Shadow Wars is one of the best hybrid games to date, most acknowledge that it presents little innovation for either of its role-playing game or real time strategy genres.

References

External links 
Official SpellForce website

2006 video games
Fantasy video games
Real-time strategy video games
Role-playing video games
Video games developed in Germany
Video games with expansion packs
Video games featuring protagonists of selectable gender
Windows games
Windows-only games
JoWooD Entertainment games
THQ Nordic games
Aspyr games
Multiplayer and single-player video games
Deep Silver games